Sean Scannell (born 17 September 1990) is a professional footballer who plays as a winger for EFL League Two club Grimsby Town.

Scannell began his career with Crystal Palace where he scored 12 goals in 130 League appearances between 2007 and 2012. He then signed for Huddersfield Town where he spent the next six seasons. He has since played for Burton Albion, Bradford City and Blackpool. He has represented the Republic of Ireland at U17, U18, U19, U21 and B level.

Club career

Crystal Palace
Scannell joined Palace at 14 and notched 23 goals for the academy during the 2006–07 season, graduating to the reserves before breaking into the first team in the 2007–08 season. Scannell made his debut for Crystal Palace in a 2–1 win at London rivals QPR in December 2007 as a substitute. In his home debut against Sheffield Wednesday on 15 December, he again came on as a substitute in the second half and scored a 90th-minute winner, his first senior goal in a 2–1 victory for Crystal Palace. He finished that campaign having featured in 25 games, earning him a call up to the Republic of Ireland Under-17's squad and was named Palace's Young Player of the Year in 2008.

Following this, Scannell was offered a two and a half year professional contract with Palace. Scannell signed the contract at the beginning of the new year, and celebrated by scoring Palace's second goal in a 3–0 victory against Wolverhampton Wanderers the following weekend.

At the end of the 2008–09 season, and still only 18 years old, Scannell was voted Championship Apprentice of the Year.
He made steady progress over the following two campaigns, but missed the first half of the 2010–11 campaign because of a knee injury, that restricted him to 19 outings over the 2010–11 league campaigns although he did manage to score twice in both seasons.

The 2011–12 season was Scannell's best season for the Eagles, with 37 league appearances, four goals and three assists. His form early in the season earned him a new four-and-a-half-year contract in September 2011. He was given the freedom to play down the middle or out wide drifting in and out of dangerous positions in the attacking line.

Huddersfield Town
It was reported on 22 June 2012 that newly promoted Huddersfield Town were poised to make Scannell the club's first signing of 2012 since winning promotion to the Championship via the League One play-offs. The reports stated that Scannell who was linked with the Terriers in January 2012, had agreed a three-year deal for an undisclosed fee and would move subject to a medical. Later that day, Scannell signed a three-year contract with Huddersfield, making him Simon Grayson's first permanent signing for the club. He made his league debut in the 1–0 defeat by Cardiff City at the Cardiff City Stadium on 17 August. On 3 November 2012, he scored his first goal for the club in a 1–0 victory versus Bristol City.

On 18 August 2017, Scannell joined Championship club Burton Albion on loan for the 2017–2018 season. The loan was cut short on 11 January 2018 due to an injury.

Bradford City
On 19 July 2018, Scannell signed for League One club Bradford City on an initial two-year deal for an undisclosed fee.

Blackpool
After one year at Valley Parade, Scannell joined Blackpool on a free transfer. He was released in June 2020.

Grimsby Town
On 2 September 2020, Scannell signed a two-year deal for League Two club Grimsby Town. Scannell's debut season with Grimsby was hit by a string of injuries for Ian Holloway's side, this limited him to 13 appearances in all competitions without scoring.

Scannell scored his first goal for Grimsby in a 2–0 away victory over Yeovil Town on 10 March 2022, Mariners boss Paul Hurst commented that Scannell had been on the edges of the first team all season but due to injury and not being selected he had found it hard to include him, but equally praising his effort in training and for taking his opportunity.

He went on to feature as a regular in the Grimsby team before rupturing his Achilles in a game against Maidenhead United. Grimsby secured promotion with victory in the play-off final, though Scannell was not in the matchday squad at London Stadium.

On 8 July 2022, Paul Hurst announced Scannell had extended his contract by signing a new short term deal, confirming the club would continue to support him as he continue his lengthy rehab following his injury. On 5 January 2023, Hurst announced that Scannell had extended his contract until the end of the 2022–23 season, having recovered and returned from his latest injury.

International career

Republic of Ireland
As Scannell was born in England and is of Irish and Jamaican heritage, he is eligible to play international football for four national teams. His father being from County Armagh allows him the choice between Northern Ireland or the Republic. He has represented the Republic of Ireland at Under-17, Under-18, Under-19, Under-21 and Ireland B levels.

Scannell made his under-21 debut in a 1–1 draw with Montenegro in March 2008 at Terryland Park in Galway. In 2007, he was awarded the Young Player of the Year award by the Football Association of Ireland. Scannell was named man of the match in the under-21s' 1–1 draw with Germany on 10 February 2009 at Turners Cross in Cork. He made 10 appearances for the under-21s between 2009 and 2012. On 30 July 2012, Scannell received his first call up to the under-21 squad since joining Huddersfield Town, for the European Championship qualifier against Turkey. He would play the final 10 minutes for the Irish in his 10th appearance.

His good form with Palace led to him being recognised for the Republic of Ireland senior team by coach Giovanni Trapattoni, who called Scannell into his 28-man squad for friendlies against Serbia and Colombia in 2008.

Northern Ireland
In May 2018, it was reported that Scannell had submitted the required paperwork to FIFA to declare for Northern Ireland and would be involved in the squad's upcoming Nations League campaign.

Personal life
Born in Croydon, London, Scannell is the brother of Tonbridge Angels player Damian Scannell and as a youngster growing up played for Addiscombe Corinthians and Afewee Academy.

Scannell's father is from County Armagh, and he is also of Jamaican heritage.

Career statistics

Honours

Huddersfield Town
EFL Championship play-off: 2016–17

Grimsby Town
National League play-off: 2022

References

External links

Sean Scannell profile  at the Huddersfield Town A.F.C. website
Sean Scannell profile at the Football Association of Ireland website

1990 births
Living people
Footballers from Croydon
English footballers
Republic of Ireland association footballers
Republic of Ireland youth international footballers
Republic of Ireland under-21 international footballers
Republic of Ireland B international footballers
Association football wingers
Crystal Palace F.C. players
Huddersfield Town A.F.C. players
Burton Albion F.C. players
English Football League players
English people of Irish descent
English people of Jamaican descent
Irish people of Jamaican descent
Bradford City A.F.C. players
Blackpool F.C. players
Grimsby Town F.C. players
Irish people of Afro-Caribbean descent